Stephen Charles Sloan (born August 19, 1944) is a former American football player, coach, and college athletics administrator.  He played college football as a quarterback at the University of Alabama from 1962 to 1965 and then played for two seasons in the National Football League with the Atlanta Falcons (1966–1967).  Sloan served as the head football coach at Vanderbilt University (1973–1974), Texas Tech University (1975–1977), the University of Mississippi (1978–1982), and Duke University (1983–1986), compiling a career record of 68–86–3. He also served as the athletic director at the University of Alabama, the University of North Texas, University of Central Florida, and the University of Tennessee at Chattanooga before his retirement in 2006.  In 2000, Sloan was inducted into the Tennessee Sports Hall of Fame.

Early life
Steve Sloan was born in Austin, Texas, on August 19, 1944, to C.L. "Preacher" and Virginia Byrd Sloan. His father served in the U.S. Air Force, and the family moved regularly before settling in Cleveland, Tennessee in 1953. Sloan attended Bradley County High School where he was the quarterback on the football team, and also played baseball, basketball, and golf. He graduated in 1962 with academic honors. That year his school won state championships in football, basketball, and track. While at Bradley, Sloan earned all-state honors in football and basketball and was named one of the top prep golfers in the state.

Playing career
Sloan played college football at the University of Alabama under legendary coach Paul "Bear" Bryant between 1962 and 1965.  He arrived in Tuscaloosa in 1962, though was not eligible to play with the varsity team due to NCAA rules at the time. In his sophomore season, Sloan was a backup to quarterback Joe Namath, but played in most games at defensive back.  Sloan quarterbacked the Tide's final regular season game and the Sugar Bowl when Bryant benched Namath for disciplinary reasons. The 1963 Crimson Tide went 9–2 with a 12–7 victory over Ole Miss in the Sugar Bowl.

Sloan was the primary quarterback in his junior season in 1964 while Namath was injured. The 1964 team finished 10–1, won the Southeastern Conference title, and was named the consensus national champion.  However, in the 1965 Orange Bowl versus Texas, Sloan was forced out of the game with injury.  Namath came off the bench to win MVP honors despite Alabama losing, 21–17.

Following the departure of Namath to the American Football League, Sloan became Alabama's full-time starter for the 1965 season, in which Alabama repeated as SEC and national champions. The team finished 9–1–1 with a 39–28 victory over Nebraska in the 1966 Orange Bowl.

After college, Sloan was selected by the NFL's Atlanta Falcons in the 11th round of the 1966 NFL Draft.  He played sparingly as a back-up over the course of two seasons.  In his brief NFL career, he only appeared in eight games, and only one as a starter.  During those eight games, he completed 10 of 31 passes, for no touchdowns and four interceptions.

Coaching career
In 1971, Sloan received his first coaching job as an offensive coordinator for the Florida State Seminoles. The following year, he moved to the Georgia Tech Yellow Jackets for the same position.

In 1973, Sloan took his first job as a head coach of the Vanderbilt Commodores. In his first season, Vanderbilt finished at 5–6, including a 1–6 record in conference play. During his second season, however, Vanderbilt finished at 7–3–1 and qualified for a post-season bowl game. The team was placed in the Peach Bowl against the Texas Tech Red Raiders. The two teams played to a 6–6 tie in the game. It was Vanderbilt's first bowl game since 1955 and second in school history.

The Texas Tech University athletic department offered Sloan head football coaching position in January 1975. Though Sloan originally declined, he took the job on January 2, 1975. Texas Tech was believed to have offered him a US$30,000 per year contract, as well as $11,000 from television show income. He took five of his assistant coaches with him to the Red Raiders program, including defensive coordinator Bill Parcells. In his three seasons with Texas Tech, Sloan compiled a 23–12 record.

In late 1977, Sloan took his third head coaching job with the Ole Miss Rebels football program. Sloan was head coach for five seasons at Ole Miss, winning 20 games, losing 34, and tying one. His best season came in 1978 when the Rebels finished at 5–6.

In December 1982, Sloan decided to leave Ole Miss to become the head football coach for the Duke Blue Devils football program. In his first season at Duke, Sloan led the Blue Devils to a 3–8 record, despite beginning the season 0–7. In his remaining three seasons, he compiled a 10–23 record before resigning. Steve Spurrier was named as his successor.

Head coaching record

See also
 List of NCAA major college football yearly passing leaders

References

Further reading

External links
 

1944 births
Living people
American football quarterbacks
Alabama Crimson Tide athletic directors
Alabama Crimson Tide football coaches
Alabama Crimson Tide football players
Alabama Crimson Tide men's golf coaches
Chattanooga Mocs athletic directors
Duke Blue Devils football coaches
Florida State Seminoles football coaches
Georgia Tech Yellow Jackets football coaches
North Texas Mean Green athletic directors
Ole Miss Rebels football coaches
Texas Tech Red Raiders football coaches
UCF Knights athletic directors
Vanderbilt Commodores football coaches
Players of American football from Austin, Texas
People from Cleveland, Tennessee
Coaches of American football from Tennessee
Players of American football from Tennessee
Atlanta Falcons players